Tibersyrnola guzzettii is a species of sea snail, a marine gastropod mollusk in the family Pyramidellidae, the pyrams and their allies.

Description
The length of the shell varies between 9 mm and 14 mm.

Distribution
This species occurs in the Indian Ocean off Madagascar.

References

External links
 To Encyclopedia of Life
 To World Register of Marine Species
 

Pyramidellidae
Gastropods described in 2007